This is a list of films produced by the Ollywood film industry based in Bhubaneshwar and Cuttack in 1968:

A-Z

References

1968
Ollywood
Films, Ollywood
1960s in Orissa